Varappuzha, (also known by its former name Verapoly) is a northern suburb of the city of Kochi. It is a census town in Paravur Taluk, Ernakulam district in the Indian state of Kerala. Situated around 15 km (9 mi) from the city centre and 8 km (5 mi) from Edapally, the areas lies in the NH 66 connecting Vytilla with North Paravur. Its specialty is that considerably large-scale paddy cultivating area is situating western part of Varapuzha which is called Devaswompadam, specialised with Pokkali paddy cultivation and interim crop as fish cultivation locally called 'Kettu'. The common work of the natives are fishing and agriculture. Varapuzha is known for its fish market (Chettibagam market).

The Varapuzha Bridge (Near Historical Varapuzha Island) connects Varapuzha (Mannantturuthu) with the neighboring Cheranallur.

Demographics
 India census, Varappuzha had a population of 24,516. Males constitute 48% of the population and females 52%. Varappuzha has an average literacy rate of 84%, higher than the national average of 59.5%: male literacy is 85%, and female literacy is 83%. In Varappuzha, 11% of the population is under 6 years of age.

Worship Centers
The majority of population belongs to Christian community. In Chirakkakom and Thevarkad most of the people belongs to Hindu Kudumbi and Konkani community.

Churches
 Mount Carmel & St. Joseph's Basilica; Catholic Latin Church, Varapuzha, ESTD - 1673 November (Former Cathedral of Archdiocese of Verapoly)-Varapuzha Church

 St. George Syro-Malabar Catholic Church, (1788 - Constructed - 36 acres in Manampady)- Puthenpally
 St. Thomas Syro-Malabar Catholic Church, Varapuzha
 Infant Jesus Catholic Church, Thundathumkadavu
 St. Mary's Syro-Malabar Catholic Church, Thundathumkadavu
 St Anthony's Catholic Church, Chennur
 Christ The King Catholic Church, Christnagar, Chettibhagam
 Sacred Heart Catholic Church, Thevarkad
 St. Mary's Catholic Church, Muttinakam
 St. Sebastian Substation Church , Devaswampadam
 Varapuzha Brethren Church, Varapuzha

Temples
 Sree Mahadeva Temple, Thirumuppam
 Sree Kattil Bhagavathy Temple, Mannamthuruth
 Kuttikkattu Sree JayaDurga Temple
 Sree Varaha Swamy Temple, Varahapuram
 Devaswompadam Vanadurga Temple
 Vishnu Temple Chirakkakom
 Gurudeva Temple Mannamthuruth
 SreeNarayana Temple Thevarkad
 Murtuga Temple Thevarkad
 Sree Narayana Gurudeva Temple Thundathumkadavu

Masjid
 Muhayudeen Jumua Masjid Mannamthuruth

Varapuzha Island Institutions
 Mortal Remain of Bishops & Archbishops Resting in Varapuzha Island Mount Carmel & St. Joseph's Basilica
 Mother Eliswa (CTC - Servant of God) Resting in Varapuzha Island St Joseph Convent
 St. Joseph's Monastery of O.C.D. fathers of Manjummel Province (Varapuzha Island)
 Varapuzha Landing Post Office (85 Years Above)
 Government Community Health Center, Varappuzha
 Carmel Welfare Center (CWC) Varapuzha Landing
 Marian Sneha Nivas (A Unit of Marian sneha bhavan Kochi) Varapuzha Landing - 683517
 Casadel Riverwood (A Residential project with 28 Villas) Varapuzha

Education
Schools
 St.Joseph Girls HS - ESTD. 1890 (Varapuzha Landing (Island)
 Holy Infant Boys HS - ESTD. 1909 (Varapuzha Landing (Island)
 St. George Higher Secondary School, Puthenpally
 Infant Jesus LP School, Thundathumkadavu
 Govt.U.P School, Chirakkakom
 St.Joseph LP School, Mannamthuruthu
 St.Mary’s LP School Muttinakom
 Isabella de Rosis Public School, Thevarkad

Market
 Chettibhagam market

Localities
Varapuzha (Varapuzha Landing P.O.), Thevarkad, Vattapotta, Chirakkakom, Puthenpally, Muttinakom, Mannamthuruth, Thundathumkadavu, Chettibhagam, Devaswompadam, Kadamakkudy, Olanad, Muttinakam

See also
 Paravur Taluk
 Ernakulam district

References

Cities and towns in Ernakulam district
Suburbs of Kochi